was a Japanese daimyō.

In 1617, he helped build the Amagasaki Castle.

References 

|-

|-

Daimyo
1576 births
1655 deaths
Deified Japanese people